(KwK) (German, 'fighting vehicle cannon') was the designation given to any type of tank gun mounted in an armoured fighting vehicle or infantry fighting vehicle of the German-Wehrmacht until 1945. The wording was derived from the German nouns Kampfwagen (fighting vehicle) and Kanone (cannon or gun). However, the present-day designation in German speaking armed forces to this particular weapon system is Panzerkanone ('tank gun').

Kampfwagenkanonen, developed in Germany, were normally derived from the construction concept of anti tank guns (Panzerabwehrkanone). Modifications were used in the anti-aircraft artillery (Flakartillerie) as well.

Examples 
The following table contains examples of Kampfwagenkanonen, operated by the Wehrmacht in World War II.

See also
List of Sd.Kfz. designations

References 

Tank guns of Germany